The 1990–91 NBA season was the Kings' 42nd season in the National Basketball Association, and sixth season in Sacramento. In the 1990 NBA draft, the Kings became the first team in NBA history to wield four first round draft choices, selecting forward Lionel Simmons out of La Salle University with the seventh pick, guard Travis Mays with the 14th pick, center Duane Causwell with the 18th pick, and forward Anthony Bonner with the 23rd pick. However, their struggles continued as they lost their first seven games of the season, on their way to an awful 1–13 start. The Kings finished last place in the Pacific Division with a 25–57 record, losing a record of 37 consecutive road games, and finishing with the worst road record in NBA history at 1–40.

Wayman Tisdale only played just 33 games due to a foot injury, and Bonner only played in just 34 games. Simmons made the NBA All-Rookie First Team, while Mays was selected to the NBA All-Rookie Second Team. Following the season, Antoine Carr was traded to the San Antonio Spurs, and Mays was dealt to the Atlanta Hawks.

For the season, the team changed their uniforms, plus adding darker blue road jerseys. The uniforms lasted until 1994.

Draft picks

Roster

Regular season

Season standings

y - clinched division title
x - clinched playoff spot

z - clinched division title
y - clinched division title
x - clinched playoff spot

Record vs. opponents

Game log

Player statistics

Awards and records
 Lionel Simmons, NBA All-Rookie Team 1st Team
 Travis Mays, NBA All-Rookie Team 2nd Team

Transactions

References

Sacramento Kings seasons
Sacramento
Sacramento
Sacramento